Eupithecia cooptata is a moth in the family Geometridae. It is found in France and Spain.

The length of the forewings is 10.5–11.5 mm.

The larvae feed on Artemisia camphorata.

References

Moths described in 1903
cooptata
Moths of Europe